Placy-Montaigu is a former commune in the Manche department in Normandy in north-western France. On 1 January 2017, it was merged into the new commune Saint-Amand-Villages.

See also
Communes of the Manche department

References

Placymontaigu